Sir John Berkeley Monck  (18 December 1883 – 31 March 1964) was Marshal of the Diplomatic Corps in the Royal Household of the Sovereign of the United Kingdom from 1945 to 1950.

Life
He was the son of William Berkeley Monck of Coley Park, Mayor of Reading, Berkshire in 1888, and his wife Althea Pauline Louise Fanshawe.

He was His Majesty's Assistant Marshal 1920 to 1936, then His Majesty's Vice-Marshal of the Diplomatic Corps 1936 to 1945, and acting Marshal 1939 to 1945, when Lieutenant-General Sir George Clive was on war duty.

In 1952 he became a Gentleman Usher in the Household of Queen Elizabeth II.

References

Marshals of the Diplomatic Corps
Companions of the Order of St Michael and St George
Knights Grand Cross of the Royal Victorian Order
1883 births
1964 deaths